is a Japanese manga series created by Michiaki Watanabe. The manga centers around a group of adventurers named Hamel, Flute, Raiel, Trom and Sizer. All 5 are attempting to travel North, to the "Continent of Demons" in order to avert a great disaster. Hamel plays a violin; his music convinces the monsters he faces to pay for their sins and commit suicide.

Manga
GanGan Comics ran the manga for approximately 10 years and 37 volumes were published.

The manga combines a serious story with an irreverent tone; characters frequently shift between heroic and pathetic as the situation warrants. The manga also contains a myriad of unconventional running gags, such as Hamel's repeated attempts to force other members of the party into costume. Each chapter is referred to as a movement.

Setting
The setting resembles a medieval steampunk Europe judging by the architecture, the way people are dressed, technology and the local environment are shown in the background. The world in which the story takes place is a steampunk universe consisting of a mixture of significant futuristic technological advancement and medieval architecture. 

The main characters live in a world named "Europe" after the current continent of the same name. However, a map shown in the manga, shows little resemblance to the continent.

History

The world they are currently living is dominated by two races, the human race and the Mazoku race. The Mazoku are demonic creatures that once ruled the world, until they were all sealed away into a tiny box by a heroic angel 500 years ago. An age of prosperity and peace arose, and human civilization blossomed. Cities were built and nations were created. Science advanced in some, while magic became the source of power for others. One day, a woman by the name of Pandora accidentally opens the box containing all the demons, releasing them all from their imprisonment, darkening the skies and dooming human race to extinction at the hands of the Mazoku. In a desperate attempt to save humanity, the Demon King Chestra, who was also released from that box, was sealed again. Pandora's two children, who were fathered by Chestra as part of the deception used to trick her, were separated as infants; one was taken by the Mazoku, the other remained with her mother. In order to keep the world safe, the box that sealed the Demon King, now named Pandora's box, was sent far away, and the key that opened the box was also sent far away, in hopes that even if the Mazoku would ever get their hands on one, they would unable to make use of it. All the demons who were released then headed north, and occupied the northernmost continent and called it their capital, Hameln. Now a never-ending war arose against the humans and demons in order to survive. Pandora's children - one who lives with the humans is hated by all those around him; the other, living with the Mazoku who have never felt any sign of affection from them - are destined to be reunited and bring an end to the war, one way or another.

Plot

The plot for the manga revolves around the hero Hamel who travels northbound towards the continent of demons in order to avert a great disaster. Using his magical oversized violin, he plays music that would force his enemies to repent for their sins and kill themselves – or so that was how the story should have been. The so-called Hamel is instead a selfish, cowardly, heartless, and immoral fiend that seeks to take advantage of those around him and extort from those he saves. After saving the remote village of Staccato from nearby demons, he decides to abduct an orphaned girl named Flute as payment for his services. Hamel, Flute, and Oboe, Hamel's advisor who is a talking crow, head north on their long, arduous and ridicule filled journey. Along the way, they meet Raiel, the hero of Love who plays beautiful and powerful tunes that can summon spirits and manipulate people with his 500kg solid gold piano; he is actually Hamel's childhood friend. Their first encounter results in a not so deadly battle for revenge. Next they encounter Trombone, the young prince of Dal Segno, the warrior nation renowned for their knights and their swordsmanship. Having his country burned to the ground and his parents murdered in front of his eyes, the young prince swears revenge and joins are party northwards in their quest. Adventure, hilarity, and humiliation ensues as Hamel leads the ragtag band north while performing street performances bicker with each other. Along the way, they fight dreadful enemies and eventually meet Hell Hawk King Sizer, one of the Lords of hell, the guardians of the Demons Legions. In a mostly one-sided battle, Hamel's Violin is broken. It is also revealed that Hamel is actually the son of the Demon King Chestra, and that he heads north in order to defeat his father and save his mother Pandora.

As they venture further north, they eventually reach the kingdom of Sforzando, one of the most powerful nations of their world, renowned for their magic knight corps, their healing magic, and the strongest woman alive, Queen Horn. While at Sforzando, they meet the Head Priest of Sforzando, they greatest magic user in all of their kingdom, who immediately takes a dislike to Hamel. It is revealed that Flute, the victim of Hamel's humiliating antics was actually the only princess of Sforzando, who was unfortunately abandoned as a baby in order to increase her chance of survival when Sforzando was besieged in a dreadful war many years ago. Reunited with her estranged mother, Flute tries to deal with many pent-up emotions while Hamel is sent out in order to Seek out a man capable of fixing his magical violin. Unfortunately, during Hamel and Raiel's absence, Sforzando is besieged yet again by the armies of Hell. Leading them are Dragon King Drum and King of the Beasts Guitar, both extremely strong and one of the 4 Lords of Hell. A fierce battle ensues, where both powerful forces collide and tens of thousands of both sides perish. In the end, Hamel and Raiel return after meeting Vi Olin and having the violin fixed in order to finish their foes off. In a last-ditch effort with everyone attacking at the same time, they manage to subdue the Dragon King Drum who had turned into a 48 headed hydra.

The battle ends with the victory of Sforzando, and the revelation that the Queen had only a few years left to live, as her barrier magic requires the user to pay by giving up their lifespan. Once preparations were done, Hamel, Raiel, Trombone and Oboe set off once again on their quest to the northern continent. Torn between wanting to stay with her newly reunited mother and re-joining her rather ungrateful companions on their journey, she eventually chooses to follow Hamel and slowly realizes her feelings for him. At this point, the party splits up. Raiel heads to Staccato to deliver the money given to Hamel should he choose to leave Flute behind in Sforzando; Trombone goes back to Dal Segno to pay respects to those who perished there; Flute, Hamel and Oboe head north, and are joined by Cornet, Clarinet's younger sister.

A sequel to the series called Violinist of Hameln: Shchelkunchik started serialization in January 2008. It involves the travels of a young boy named Schel who wishes to become a wizard. Along the way he meets Hamel's son, Great.

Anime
The TV adaptation was twenty-five episodes long and suffered from budget constraints. A substantial portion of the story is told by panning over still images, with full animation reserved mainly for action-heavy scenes. The anime has a darker setting than the manga, and although it initially follows the basic outline of the manga's plot, the two stories completely diverge by the anime's conclusion.

Also of note is a 30-minute animated movie, whose storyline does not intersect with the TV series. The movie was released several months before the TV series, and benefits from a substantially higher animation budget.

Video game
The game was made for SNES by Enix (which also published the GanGan Comics magazine) and is a side-scrolling platformer. It largely follows the manga but changes were made so Flute is met at the beginning of the story. As the game progresses, other jumps are made in the story. The game requires players to throw Flute and put her in various costumes in order to reach the end of the level. Numerous demons from the manga appear in the game as bosses.

Throughout the game Hamel will pick up numerous costumes that Flute will wear in order to reach the goal.

Ostrich - Allows Flute to walk on spikes
Frog - When ridden Flute will jump very high
Robot - When jumped on will destroy blocks
Duck - Can swim across water and will dive when jumped on
Penguin - Can swim across water and will dash when jumped on
Monster - Used to trick a monster to let you across a bridge
Monkey - Will climb wall when ridden
Orangutan - Used to progress the story
Sunfish - Floats when ridden
Frisbee - Acts like a boomerang when thrown
Curling Puck - Slides when thrown
Elephant - Shoots water when jumped on
Octopus - Allows Hamel to move in any direction under water when ridden
UFO - Hovers and follows Hamel
Eagle - Flies in the direction Hamel is facing when ridden

Characters

Protagonists 
 Main Party 

 Hamel - The 18-year-old main character. A traveling hero who uses a violin - which is the size of a double bass - and magical music to fight his enemies. He can be very rude, perverted, and cruel, but he loves his friends and family just as much as anyone else. When his demon blood awakens, he becomes a powerful Mazoku. He is the son of Pandora and the Demon King Chestra.
 Oboe- Hamel's constant guardian and companion, a crow. In time it's revealed he is a former general of Chestra's - the ex-Hawk King, specifically. During his time as the Hawk King, Oboe was considered even more powerful than Bass and possessed power only second to that of Demon King Chestra.
 Flute- The 16-year-old female lead who grew up in the small mountain village of Staccato. She is heir to the Sforzando throne, and the King and Queen Horn's daughter. As a result, she is capable of healing magic, an ability that pops up later in the storyline, and creating barriers. However, using her magic shortens her lifespan.
 Raiel- Childhood friend of Hamel's. He is in fact the only human friend Hamel ever had as a child, and became the first human other than his mother that Hamel would trust. Through exposure to Pandora's magical music as a child, he became capable of summoning spirits by playing his golden piano; a memento from his deceased parents.
 Trombone- Usually referred to as Trom. The prince of the destroyed country of Dal Segno. He is the youngest main character and is an excellent swordsman with his primary attack being the scissor slash. He and Hamel are often at odds with each other, though they have very similar personalities.
 Sizer- The head of the demons' airborne Hawk Army, later revealed to be Hamel's younger twin sister. Unlike her brother, her appearance is that of an angel with blood-red feathers, rather than a human with demonic features. She uses a huge scythe in combat and can summon Valkyries with magical music, via her scythe that she plays like a flute. She was kidnapped by the Mazoku as an infant, and tricked into being hostile towards humans. Over the course of her encounters with her brother, she betrays the Mazoku and joins Hamel's party, attempting to redeem herself.
 Ocarina- Sizer's servant who often takes the form of a crow with a scar over her right eye. In later chapters it's revealed that she is Oboe's daughter, and her true form is that of a winged woman. She was Sizer's only companion when she was growing up, taking care of her after every battle, and comforting her when she was lonely and sad.
 Sforzando 

 Queen Horn- The Queen of Sforzando and Flute's mother. Wise and compassionate - though she dotes on her daughter to an unusual degree - her health is poor as a result of using her healing magic too often. She is also the mother of Lute, the "Demon of Sforzando", who fell under the control of Hell King Bass many years ago, and whose loss she mourns.
 Clarinet- A 20-something man with long, golden hair who is the High Priest and Commander of the Magic Corps. He is currently the strongest magic user in the world, second only to the power of the Sforzando family lineage.
 Percuss- One of Queen Horn's ministers. A middle-aged, monocle man and a very skilled magician, he is very distrustful of Hamel.
 King of Sforzando- The unnamed, deceased king of Sforzando that only appears in flashback. He is used almost entirely as comedic relief, as everyone - his wife and son included - often forget who he is.
 Cornet- Clari's younger sister. In the manga she has a huge crush on Hamel and tries anything and everything to get Flute out of her way as a romantic rival. She is also spoiled rotten by Clari. Later on in the series she unintentionally transforms herself into mazoku like being In the anime her character is very straight-laced, devoted to Queen Horn, and grows close to Trom.
 Lute- Flute's older brother. He once was called the "Demon of Sforzando" and was greatly feared by all the Mazoku, and admired and loved by all the people. Soon after Flute's birth the kingdom was attacked; Lute sacrificed his life to save his family but fell under the control of Bass.

Antagonists 
The demon army that wishes to revive Demon King Chestra by opening Pandora's Box. Immortal unless slain or consuming all their energy, they seek to free Chestra, who radiates so much power they can live off it indefinitely.

 Hell King Bass- The head general of the demon armies and leader of the army of the undead. His body has been reduced to his head, but he has possessed the body of Flute's brother Lute. Possesses immense magical power and is feared by all who serve under him.
 Dragon King Drum- The head of the Dragon Army who is an ogre-like monster with two heads. He was eventually killed during the invasion on Sforzando. Famed for his physical might and stupidity.
 Warrior King Guitar- The 4th general of Hameln is a centaur-like canine creature: his upper half is an anthropomorphic dog, and his lower half is a hooved greyhound. He uses a wide variety of mystic swords and is a cunning schemer, but very cowardly.
 Orgel- (Hell's Clown) His appearance is that of a masked jester with a very exaggerated costume. He is one of Bass' special servants in the Undead Army. Torturing his targets with psychological warfare, he can animate spirits of the dead and is a master of powerful illusions.
 Vocal- A wild, arrogant demon who rebelled against Chestra's authority. He was imprisoned for five-hundred years due to his actions, but is later released so he can provoke Hamel to awaken Chestra. His full power is sealed by Bass, though even so he is tremendously powerful, strong and fast; even Bass fears him.
 Pick - Seen only in flashback, Pick was once the 3rd warlord of Hameln, upholding their laws and commander of the Fiend Army. He was slain by Lute years ago before he himself fell.
 Demon King Chestra- The pun on his name comes from the Japanese word for "king", being "ou". Hence, "Ou Chestra" (Orchestra). He is Hamel and Sizer's father, and as his title suggests, he is the king of the demons.

Other Characters 
 Pandora - The woman who opened a box that released misery into the world. As a result, the box was named "Pandora's Box". She was a kind and caring woman who loved her children, though sometimes fell victim to paranoid distrust of others as a result of the condemnation she received. In flashback, it was revealed that she opened the box for the sake of her children, as they were being held hostage and she had no other choice.
Vi Olin (Introduced in Movement 26) - The inventor who made Hamel's giant magical violin, and the creator of Pandora's box in which was sealed the Demon King Chestra and his minions. He also created the Sword That Can Cut Through Anything, which ironically was what was used to cut through the lock on Pandora's box. In chapter 128, it is revealed that he is Sizer's and Hamel's grandfather, the father of Pandora. Also, it is revealed that he is an angel, therefore explaining Sizer's wings.

Violinist of Hameln: Shchelkunchik 
The sequel. The plot takes place 20 years after the war against the Mazoku. It features the children of protagonists of Violinist of Hameln. The "Shchelkunchik" subtitle is the original Russian name for "The Nutcracker" ballet. It ran for 8 volumes, ending abruptly with Watanabe citing health issues.

Characters 
Shchel - A boy whom Clari saved 10 years after the war. He enters Sforzando's School of Magic hoping to be a magician just like the Clari. He seems to hiding dark secrets about his body. It seems he cannot wield magic without Piroro's consent. The secret concerning his body may be connected with the dark fairies.
Piroro - A fairy accompanying Shchel. She seems to detest Great. It seems that she was forcefully taken from her home shortly before meeting and accompanying Shchel.
Great - (Alternate spelling: Grate.) Hamel and Flute's son, who seems to take after his father in both looks and personality. He can play the violin with magic music like his father, though not yet as good as Hamel. He too, had entered Sforzando's School of Magic. He has inherited Demon King Chestra's blood which makes other demons bow to him out of respect. This leads to Great to have a childhood similar to Hamel's. Although he seems to carry a cold attitude towards his family and strangers, he does it from fear of hurting them. He opens up shortly after meeting Shchel.
Lute - Hamel and Flute's son, Great's older brother. He resembles Flute's brother, Lute. He is also the Captain of the Kuu Crusaders, the group of strongest cadets in the Magicorps. When Lute tries to help Shchel with his magic, Lute is one of the first to notice the strange and dark aura surrounding Shchel.
Gospel - A classmate of Shchel and Great, a shaman from the ghost country, Dotar. He uses skulls.
Count Ridge - A classmate of Shchel and Great, from a family of merchants rumoured to be vampire aristocrats.
Bonshou Rei - A classmate of Shchel and Great, he looks like a jiangshi. He has a divine beast: a tiger called Kayagumu. After he is beat up by Great he leaves the school and returns his country.
Tinor Sax Bone - A classmate of Shchel and Great, a swordsman from Dal Segno. He can summons demon dogs from his black sword. He blames the Mazoku blood for the handicapping of his father and the strange illness that his mother carries.(He may be the son of Trom Bone and Corrnet because his family name).
Biyorne and Blanche - Classmates of Shchel and Great, a pair of warrior sisters known as the String Sisters. Blanche seems to have a crush on Shchel. Biyorne is responsible for looking out for her sister's safety. Biyorne wields an enormous axe while Blanche wields an enormous hammer.
Ocarina - Raiel and Sizer's daughter. She can play the flute to summon small Valkyries. She is also Great's and Lute's cousin. It seems that her growth is accelerated because of the inherited angel blood from her mother.
Harmony - A girl with butterfly wings and a double-edged scythe. She is currently a member of the Fairy kingdom's Poison Moths. Their insignia is carved on the top of her scythe. She may be Shchel's lover. She carries both Shchel's and his mother's ring.
Si and Chest - Hamel and Flute's son.
David
Snow Drop Kiy and Elect

Zoku Violinist of Hameln: Ai no Bolero  
Two years after the sequel manga abruptly ended, Watanabe created a sort of alternate universe version of the original series. The series is titled Zoku Violinist of Hameln: Ai no Bolero, where "Zoku" means "continued." Very little is known about the series, as no one has attempted to translate it. It started in 2013 and it's still running. It is initially  released on Watanabe's personal website.

Reception

References

External links

1991 manga
1996 anime television series debuts
1996 anime films
Dark fantasy anime and manga
Gangan Comics manga
Music in anime and manga
Shōnen manga
Square Enix franchises
Studio Deen
TV Tokyo original programming